.global is a generic top-level domain (gTLD) and was delegated to the DNS root zone on June 6, 2014. The application for the new top-level domain was approved on April 17, 2014, and .global was made available to the general public on September 9, 2014.

Background 
The path from application to launch was rather complicated, due to the name collision concerns relating to the word "global" (as it is being used in many internal networks). As a consequence, the .global registry had to block 60,000 domain names from registration for a couple of months, until the name collision issues had been fully resolved.

References 

Generic top-level domains